Monoah Rowe (ca 1813 – May 12, 1899) was an English-born farmer, merchant, shipbuilder and political figure on Prince Edward Island. He represented 4th Kings in the Legislative Assembly of Prince Edward Island from 1873 to 1876 as a Liberal.

He came to the island in 1822. For a time, he lived in Summerside, later moving to Montague Bridge. Rowe operated a general store there. He was also a customs collector and operated a tavern in the area. He married Penelope Rowe, whose parents had also come to the island from England.

References 
 

Prince Edward Island Liberal Party MLAs
1899 deaths
Year of birth uncertain